Agape arctioides is a species of moth in the family Erebidae first described by Arthur Gardiner Butler in 1887. The species is found on Seram, the Solomon Islands (Guadalcanal and Santa Isabel Island) and in Thailand.

References

External links
Zwier, Jaap "Agape arctioides Butler, 1887". Aganainae (Snouted Tigers).

Aganainae
Moths of Asia
Moths of Oceania
Moths described in 1887